Victoria Velasco Fuentes (born 5 August 2002) is a Mexican cyclist.

In June 2021, Velasco won the madison with Acevedo Mendoza at the Pan American Track Cycling Championships in Lima, Peru. Prior to that, on 29 May 2021, Velasco also won the omnium at the Mexican Olympic trials in Guadalajara. However, a registration error by the Mexican federation made her ineligible to compete at the 2020 Summer Olympics and was discovered just days before the opening ceremony.

References

2002 births
Living people
Mexican female cyclists
Mexican track cyclists
21st-century Mexican women